César Augusto Salazar Herrera (born February 14, 1972, in Pereira, Risaralda) is a Colombian former road racing cyclist, who also holds Venezuelan nationality.

Major results

1997
 1st Overall Vuelta al Táchira
1st Stage 11
1998
 1st Stage 4 Vuelta al Táchira
1999
 1st Overall Vuelta Internacional al Estado Trujillo
 1st Stage 12 Vuelta a Venezuela
2000
 1st in Stage 3 Vuelta al Táchira
2001
 1st Overall Clásico Virgen de la Consolación de Táriba
 1st Stage 11 Vuelta al Táchira
 2nd Overall Clásico Ciclístico Banfoandes
2003
 1st Overall Vuelta a Guatemala
 1st Stages 1 & 14 Vuelta al Táchira
 3rd Overall Doble Copacabana GP Fides
2004
 1st Stages 10 & 11 Vuelta al Táchira
 2nd Overall Clásica de la Consolación
2005
 3rd Overall Vuelta a Cuba
 2nd Overall Clásica de la Consolación 
2006
 1st Stage 9 Vuelta al Táchira
 1st Stages 1 & 6 Clásico Ciclístico Banfoandes
2007
 1st Overall Vuelta a Venezuela
 1st Stages 2 (TTT), 11 & 14 Vuelta al Táchira
2008
 1st Stage 13 Vuelta a Colombia
 3rd Overall Vuelta a Bramon
2009
 1st Stage 1a (TTT) Vuelta a Lara
alongside Noel Vasquez, Yeison Delgado, Artur García, Tomás Gil, Daniel Abreu, Yonathan Salinas, and Carlos Becerra
 2nd Overall Vuelta a Venezuela
 3rd Overall Vuelta a Colombia

References
 

1972 births
Living people
Venezuelan male cyclists
Colombian male cyclists
Vuelta a Colombia stage winners
Vuelta a Venezuela stage winners
People from Risaralda Department